National Secondary Route 225, or just Route 225 (or ) is a National Road Route of Costa Rica, located in the Cartago province.

Description
In Cartago province the route covers Paraíso canton (Cachí district), Jiménez canton (Tucurrique, Pejibaye districts), Turrialba canton (La Suiza district).

History
Landslides are common in this route.

References

Highways in Costa Rica